The 2022 Città di Grado Tennis Cup was a professional tennis tournament played on outdoor clay courts. It was the twenty-fifth edition of the tournament which was part of the 2022 ITF Women's World Tennis Tour. It took place in Grado, Italy between 23 and 29 May 2022.

Singles main draw entrants

Seeds

 1 Rankings are as of 16 May 2022.

Other entrants
The following players received wildcards into the singles main draw:
  Nuria Brancaccio
  Deborah Chiesa
  Sara Errani
  Angelica Raggi

The following players received entry from the qualifying draw:
  Eudice Chong
  Dalila Jakupović
  Lisa Pigato
  Sapfo Sakellaridi
  Oana Georgeta Simion
  Lulu Sun
  Anna Turati
  Tara Würth

Champions

Singles

  Elisabetta Cocciaretto def.  Ylena In-Albon, 6–2, 6–2

Doubles

  Alena Fomina-Klotz /  Dalila Jakupović def.  Eudice Chong /  Liang En-shuo, 6–1, 6–4

References

External links
 2022 Città di Grado Tennis Cup at ITFtennis.com

2022 ITF Women's World Tennis Tour
2022 in Italian tennis
May 2022 sports events in Italy